Breutelia is a genus of moss in the family Bartramiaceae.  It has a worldwide distribution and contains about 200 species.  Its name honours botanist Johann Christian Breutel (1788–1875).  The type species is Breutelia arcuata.

Selected species
 Breutelia affinis
 Breutelia arcuata
 Breutelia chrysocoma — Golden-head Moss
 Breutelia elliptica
 Breutelia grandis
 Breutelia pendula
 Breutelia tabularis

References

 

Moss genera
Bartramiales